Viola Victorine Burnham (née Harper; 26 November 1930 – 10 October 2003) was a Guyanese politician from People's National Congress, and wife and widow of Forbes Burnham.

Early life 
Burnham was born in New Amsterdam, Berbice, the youngest of eight children of schoolmaster James Nathaniel Harper and his wife Mary (née Chin). After her father died the family moved to Georgetown, where she attended Bishops’ High School on scholarship. After a brief job at The Argosy, she became a teacher, which led her to obtain a scholarship for university abroad. She earned a B.A in Latin at University of Leicester then her M.A. in Education at University of Chicago. She returned to teach Latin at Bishops High.

Political sphere 
In 1967 she married then-Prime minister Forbes Burnham (his second marriage) and they had two daughters. In 1967, she accepted the position of Vice-Chairperson of the Women's Auxiliary of the PNC, where she was involved in reorganization and assuming more responsibility for women's issues. In 1976, she was elected as Chairperson, which by this time had become the Women's Revolutionary Socialist Movement (WRSM). Through the WRSM, Burnham was responsible for projects related to women's employment and education in Guyana as well as the greater Caribbean region. She was a founding member and Vice-President of the Caribbean Woman's Association. She also led the Guyanese delegation for the first 3 United Nations Conferences on Women. She also served as a chair on the Guyana National Commission for the Year of the Child. 

After the death of Forbes Burnham, she joined the cabinet of Desmond Hoyte as Vice President and deputy prime minister responsible for education, social development and culture in August 1985.
She was elected to Parliament in 1985. She eventually stepped down from the parliament and from the cabinet in October 1991.

Honors 
In 1984 she received the Order of Roraima.

References

1930 births
2003 deaths
Vice presidents of Guyana
First ladies of Guyana
Afro-Guyanese people
People's National Congress (Guyana) politicians
Women vice presidents
20th-century Guyanese politicians
20th-century women politicians
Women government ministers of Guyana
Women's ministers of Guyana
Education ministers of Guyana
Culture ministers of Guyana